The Syria national badminton team represents Syria in international badminton team competitions. The national team is controlled by the Syria Arab Badminton Association. The national team is recognized in the BWF as the Syrian Arab Republic. 

The Syrian junior team competed in the 2011 Asian Junior Badminton Championships mixed team event. Former Syrian national player, Aram Mahmoud was the first Syrian-born badminton athlete to play at the Summer Olympics.

Participation in Badminton Asia competitions 
Mixed team

Mixed team U19

Participation in Pan Arab Games 
The Syrian national badminton team first competed in the 1999 Pan Arab Games, where badminton was first contested in the Games. The Syrian national badminton team dominated the team championships, winning the men's team and women's team events twice and finishing up as runners-ups in 2004 and 2007.

Men's team

Women's team

Players 

Men
Ahmad Aljallad
Aram Mahmoud

Women
Tagred Aljallad
Sanaa Mahmoud

References 

Badminton
National badminton teams
Badminton in Syria